South Park Calvary United Presbyterian Church is a historic church built in 1853 and located at 1035 Broad Street in the Lincoln Park neighborhood of Newark in Essex County, New Jersey.  Only the facade remains, following a 1992 fire. Also known as the South Park Presbyterian Church, it was documented by the Historic American Buildings Survey in 1936. The church was added to the National Register of Historic Places on December 5, 1972, for its significance in architecture.

History and description
The church was designed by architect John Welch, one of the founders of American Institute of Architects, using Greek Revival style. It features a portico in Nova Scotia brownstone with four Ionic columns. The church also features twin circular colonnaded towers.

As of 2019, funding is in place to stabilize the facade and create an outdoor performance space behind it.

See also 
 National Register of Historic Places listings in Essex County, New Jersey

References

External links
 
 

Churches in Newark, New Jersey
Churches on the National Register of Historic Places in New Jersey
Churches completed in 1853
19th-century Presbyterian church buildings in the United States
Presbyterian churches in New Jersey
Historic American Buildings Survey in New Jersey
National Register of Historic Places in Newark, New Jersey
New Jersey Register of Historic Places
Greek Revival church buildings in New Jersey